Karlen Varzhapetyan (10 May 1942 – 16 July 1984) was a Soviet Armenian director of television plays.  He was posthumously named 'Honored Artist of the Armenian Soviet Socialist Republic'.

Selected Television Plays 
Uncle Vanya (Anton Chekhov)
The Land of Nairi (Yeghishe Charents)
Romeo and Juliet (William Shakespeare)
Metsamor (Hrant Matevosyan)
Neutral Zone (Hrant Matevosyan)
Kibossa, 7th Century (Hayk Vardanyan)
Whore (Krikor Zohrab)
A Piece of Sweetness (Shahan Shahnour)
The Poor Arab (William Saroyan)

References

Notes

Citations 

Soviet directors
1942 births
1984 deaths